David Berman is an American actor and researcher mostly known for his work on  CSI: Crime Scene Investigation where he played Assistant Medical Examiner David "Super Dave" Phillips. 

Behind the scenes, Berman co-founded Entertainment Research Consultants (ERC) with former CSI alum, Jon Wellner. ERC has worked on dozens of productions including CSI, CSI: Miami, Bones, The Blackist, Zoo, Dopesick, and Rizzoli & Isles. 

As an actor, Berman has a recurring role as Dr. Ogden Maguire on the NBC drama, The Blacklist. Other acting credits include Desperate Housewives, Vanished, Daybreak, Bones and recurring roles on Drop Dead Diva and Heroes. Berman also appeared in the JD Salinger bio-pic, Rebel in the Rye with Nicholas Holt.

Berman also hosted the National Geographic mini-series, Lost Faces of the Bible.

Filmography

References

External links

Place of birth missing (living people)
1973 births
Living people
American male film actors
American male television actors